John Leonard Gray (December 11, 1926 – May 21, 2014) was an American professional baseball pitcher, who played in Major League Baseball (MLB) for the Philadelphia Athletics / Kansas City Athletics, Cleveland Indians, and Philadelphia Phillies in all or part of four baseball seasons (1954–55; 1957–58).

Gray, who was born in West Palm Beach, Florida, was a graduate of Rollins College in Winter Park, Florida, where he starred for the school's baseball team in 1952. In between, Gray served for the United States Army in the Mediterranean Theater of Operations during World War II.

Gray was originally signed  by the New York Yankees as an amateur free agent in 1950. He spent four years in their minor league system, sporting a record of 44–39 and a 2.28 earned run average (ERA) in 745 pitching appearances before being traded to the Athletics in December 1953.

Gray played for the Athletics both in their final season in Philadelphia and their first season in Kansas City. He posted a 3–15 record and a 7.25 ERA in his two stints for the team before joining the Indians in 1957 and the Phillies in 1958. On July 30, 1957, he hurled a three-hit shutout against the Baltimore Orioles at Memorial Stadium in Baltimore.

In a four-season career, Gray went 4–18 with a 6.18 ERA in 48 games, including 24 starts, allowing 132 earned runs on 172 hits and 142 walks while striking out 75 in 169 innings of work.

Gray would spend 11 seasons in the minors while playing for 13 clubs between 1950 and 1960. He collected a 71–75 record and a 3.33 ERA in 275 games, which included five seasons with at least 10 victories and the best ERA in the American Association at 2.72 during the 1956 season.

Following his baseball retirement, Gray worked as an apartment complex manager in Miami, Florida, and was a long-term Palm Beach County resident. At this time, he gained induction into the Rollins College Hall of Fame as part of its 1979 Class.

On May 21, 2014, Gray died in Boca Raton, Florida at the age of 87. He was buried at the South Florida National Cemetery in Lake Worth, Florida with military honors being provided by the US Army Funeral Honor Guard.

References

External links

1926 births
2014 deaths
United States Army personnel of World War II
Amsterdam Rugmakers players
Baseball players from Florida
Beaumont Roughnecks players
Buffalo Bisons (minor league) players
Charleston Senators players
Cleveland Indians players
Columbus Jets players
Indianapolis Indians players
Kansas City Athletics players
Kansas City Blues (baseball) players
Major League Baseball pitchers
Miami Marlins (IL) players
Montreal Royals players
Navegantes del Magallanes players
American expatriate baseball players in Venezuela
Norfolk Tars players
Ottawa A's players
Philadelphia Athletics players
Philadelphia Phillies players
Rollins College alumni
Rollins Tars baseball players
San Diego Padres (minor league) players
Spokane Indians players
Sportspeople from Boca Raton, Florida
Sportspeople from West Palm Beach, Florida